Joseph A. Steger (February 17, 1937 – May 9, 2013) was president of the University of Cincinnati from 1984 to 2003. He was succeeded by Nancy L. Zimpher.

He had PhD and MS degrees from Kansas State University in Psychophysics and Statistics, and a BA from Gettysburg College in Experimental Psychology.

References

External links
Biography from the University of Cincinnati
Obituary at WLWT.com

 

1937 births
2013 deaths
Presidents of the University of Cincinnati
Kansas State University alumni
Gettysburg College alumni